Lourdes Lopez (born 1958) is a Cuban-American ballet company artistic director of Miami City Ballet and former principal dancer of New York City Ballet. She is also a member of the board of trustees of the Ford Foundation.

Miami City Ballet is the largest South Florida arts organization, reaching an annual audience of over 125,000 in four Florida Counties.  It includes a ballet school with over 1500 students and adults.

Lopez was born in Havana, Cuba, in 1958 and raised in Miami by her parents along with two sisters.  At the age of eleven she received a full scholarship to the School of American Ballet, the official school of  the New York City Ballet.  At fourteen, she moved to New York permanently to devote herself to full-time studies at the School of American Ballet, and shortly after her sixteenth birthday, she joined the corps de ballet of New York City Ballet in 1974.  She was promoted to soloist in 1981 and principal dancer in 1984 and retired at age 39 in 1997.

As a soloist and principal dancer with New York City Ballet, she danced for two legends of the art form, George Balanchine and Jerome Robbins, performing countless featured roles, including Violin Concerto, Firebird, Serenade, Liebeslieder Walzer, Divertimento No. 15, and Agon. Lopez's great interest in children also found her writing and contributing to many of the company's family matinee series.

Upon retirement in 1997, Lopez joined WNBC-TV in New York as a cultural arts reporter, writing and producing feature segments on the arts, artists and arts education. She was also a full-time senior faculty member and director of student placement, student evaluation and curriculum planning at New York's Ballet Academy East. She served on the dance faculty of Barnard College and guest taught at numerous dance institutions and festivals in the United States. She even appeared with Jock Soto in some Sesame Street segments such as demonstrating cooperation with Elmo and Zoe.

In 2002, Lopez became the executive director of The George Balanchine Foundation, which works to educate the public about dance and to further the art of ballet, with a special emphasis on the work and achievements of George Balanchine.

In 2007, Lopez co-founded Morphoses/The Wheeldon Company with Christopher Wheeldon serving as its executive director.  Morphoses is a dance company aiming to revitalize dance through innovative collaborations with important artists from the worlds of music, visual arts, design, film and fashion; and by inviting younger and broader audiences to engage in and actively experience dance.

Lopez co-founded The Cuban Artists Fund, together with community cultural leaders. The fund supports Cuban and Cuban-American artists to achieve their artistic goals, while ensuring their economic freedom.

Also In 2007 Lopez received an award from the American Immigration Law Foundation honoring Cuban Americans for their accomplishments and contributions to American society.

In September 2012, Lopez was named to be the artistic director of the Miami City Ballet bringing with her a nearly 40-year career in dance, television, teaching and arts management.

In 2014, Lopez was elected to serve on the Ford Foundation’s board of trustees, marking the first time an artist was elected to serve on its board.  She is a member of The Kennedy Center Honors artist committee.  In 2011, she received the prestigious Jerome Robbins Award for her years in dance. She has also served as a dance panelist for the National Endowment for the Arts, and has received numerous Hispanic Heritage awards.

Personal life
In 1987, Lopez married Lionel Saporta.  She is now married to George Skouras. They live in Miami Beach and have two children, Adriel Saporta and Calliste Skouras.

References

New York City Ballet principal dancers
Cuban ballerinas
Living people
1958 births
Cuban emigrants to the United States
American ballerinas
School of American Ballet alumni